Khurshid Hasan Khurshid  (born 3 January 1924 – 11 March 1988) was the Private Secretary of Muhammad Ali Jinnah, the first Governor-General of Pakistan. He was sent by Jinnah to Jammu and Kashmir in October 1947 shortly before the tribal invasion. He was arrested by Indian forces and jailed in Srinagar and finally repatriated in a prisoner exchange in 1949. He was the first elected president of Azad Kashmir. He was the founder of first Constitution of Azad Kashmir.

Khurshid often wrote his name as simply "Khurshid", which was both his first name and last name. Indian sources often mistakenly write it as "Khurshid Ahmed".

Early life 
Khurshid was born in Srinagar on 3 January 1924. His father was Maulvi Mohammad Hasan, a headmaster of a boys' school in Gilgit. Consequently, the early years of Khurshid's life were spent in Gilgit. He completed a bachelor's degree from the Amar Singh College in Srinagar. During his college years, he established Kashmir Muslim Students Federation and met Mohammad Ali Jinnah in Jalandhar for the first time in 1942.
Khurshid also wrote for the weekly Javed started by the Muslim Conference leader Allah Rakha Sagar.

Later he started working for the news agency Orient Press of India in Srinagar. When Jinnah went to Srinagar for a holiday in May 1944, Khurshid interacted with him as an agent of the Orient Press. Jinnah was impressed with him and hired him on his staff. Khurshid subsequently rose to be Jinnah's private secretary and watched the troubled political waters leading to the Partition of India from close quarters.

Khurshid was married to Begum Sorayya, a confidante of Fatimah Jinnah and the author of Memories of Fatimah Jinnah. She was the brother of journalist Khalid Hasan.

Missions to Kashmir
Jinnah sent Khurshid on a mission to Kashmir in the summer of 1947. Jinnah wanted to holiday in Kashmir at this time but, given the pressure on him to accede to one of the incoming dominions, the Maharaja Hari Singh was no mood to entertain the request. Khurshid reportedly told the Maharaja that he was an independent sovereign and need not consult anybody regarding the accession of the state. If he acceded to Pakistan, he would not have to delegate any of his powers to Sheikh Abdullah. "Pakistan would not touch a hair of his head or take an iota of his powers." Scholar Das Gupta also states that Khurshid stayed there for several months and created an atmosphere of communal frenzy against India.

At the beginning of October 1947, Jinnah sent him to Kashmir again. The Maharaja had appointed Justice Mehr Chand Mahajan, with known connections to the Indian National Congress, as his prime minister, replacing the pro-Pakistan Ram Chandra Kak. Jinnah wanted to find out Maharaja's intentions. Khurshid reported back on 12 October stating that the Maharaja was "dead set against accession to Pakistan". He also reported that the pro-India National Conference was the only party in the state. The pro-Pakistan Muslim Conference was "essentially defunct". He concluded:

In fact, Major Khurshid Anwar had already mobilised the Pashtun tribes from the Frontier for a raid on Kashmir and was poised to launch his attack on 15 October. When the tribal invasion was launched on 22 October 1947, Khurshid was still in the Valley. He was arrested on 2 November 1947 by the State Police,  who recovered maps and documents from him. Indian sources say that Khurshid had gone underground and was attempting to organise an agitation against the state government from the Jama Masjid, the hub of activity for the Muslim Conference. Khurshid remained in custody until a prisoner exchange in 1949, after the Karachi Agreement was signed by India and Pakistan.

Azad Kashmir politics
K. H. Khurshid was appointed as President of Azad Kashmir on 1 May 1959 by Ayub Khan. He was, at first, reluctant to accept this office, but eventually did so at the insistence of Fatima Jinnah who is said to have treated him as her son and had also financially supported him earn the bar-at-law degree from Lincoln's Inn. As President, K. H. Khurshid conducted the first ever 'Basic Democracy' elections in Azad Kashmir and also won in this election as the President of Azad Kashmir. According to Dawn, "following some differences with the powerful Pakistani establishment, Mr Khurshid resigned from the office of AJK president on August 5, 1964."

Death and legacy
"K. H. Khurshid died in a road accident on 11 March 1988, while travelling in a public transport vehicle as an ordinary passenger." He was buried in Muzaffarabad, Azad Kashmir. Kashmiri masses regarded him as an icon of honesty, integrity and democracy. Mr. Jinnah was once believed to have said that "Pakistan was made by him, his private secretary and his typewriter."

References

Bibliography
 
 
 
 
 
 
 

1924 births
1988 deaths
Pakistani people of Kashmiri descent
Muslim League
All India Muslim League members
Pakistani activists
Presidents of Azad Kashmir
Leaders of the Pakistan Movement